Camille Sullivan (born July 7, 1975) is a Canadian actress. She has starred in various films and television series. Among her notable television appearances are Rookie Blue, Da Vinci's Inquest, Intelligence and Shattered. She won a Leo Award for her role in Normal.

Personal life
Sullivan is from Vancouver, British Columbia. She attended an arts high school in Toronto, majoring in visual arts. She later studied acting at the University of British Columbia.

She speaks both English and French. Her other skills include ice skating, swing dancing, stage combat and kickboxing.

Filmography

Films

Television

Theatre

References

External links 

1975 births
20th-century Canadian actresses
21st-century Canadian actresses
Actresses from Toronto
Actresses from Vancouver
Canadian film actresses
Canadian musical theatre actresses
Canadian stage actresses
Canadian television actresses
Living people
University of British Columbia alumni